Munson Township may refer to:

Munson Township, Henry County, Illinois
Munson Township, Stearns County, Minnesota
Munson Township, Geauga County, Ohio